Mark Jackson (born 23 August 1982) is an English actor best known for playing artificial lifeform Isaac on the American Fox/Hulu television series The Orville (2017–present).

Early life
He has a younger sister named Danielle who works as an environmental professional.

Career
Although Jackson's early screen work has been stated to have included a role in That Peter Kay Thing, he has clarified in interviews that this is an error on IMDB, and that he has no knowledge of how it came to be credited to him, and further that he has so far been unable to remove the error from his profile. Jackson confirmed his earliest television role was a two-episode arc in ITV's The Royal Today. Since 2017, he has had a starring role in the Fox/Hulu series The Orville as artificial lifeform Isaac. Beyond this, Jackson has worked in the theatre, starring in the Royal National Theatre's productions of War Horse and One Man, Two Guvnors, the latter of which he followed on their international tour.

Personal life
Jackson has homes in London and Los Angeles.

Filmography

See also
The Orville

References

External links 
 

1982 births
Living people
Alumni of the University of East Anglia
British actors
20th-century English male actors
21st-century English male actors
British expatriate male actors in the United States